The Ballasted Orchestra is the third studio album by Stars of the Lid and their first to have its initial release on Kranky. It was released simultaneously as a double LP and a single CD in March 1997. The album features minimal, droning compositions, of varied length, some of which blend into each other. The track "Taphead" is a reference to the Talk Talk song of the same name while "Music for Twin Peaks Episode #30 Part I" and "Part II" are named as a tribute to the cult TV show.

The double vinyl album was out-of-print for years, until a remastered reissue was released by Kranky on January 7, 2013. The LP release contains the bonus track "24 Inch Cymbal" at the end of side A. Additionally, "The Artificial Pine Arch Song" runs 20:52 long on vinyl, as opposed to 18:00 on the CD. This material would not fit on a standard, 80-minute CD.

Critical reaction
The album was generally praised by critics. Stephen Cook, writing for Allmusic, stated: "Taking in such ambient milestones as Brian Eno's Apollo recording, Stars of the Lid's Brian McBride and Adam Wiltzie fashion eight floating gems with touches of industrial noise and movie soundtrack atmospherics. No drums or clanging guitars here, just darkish, elegiac slabs of ethereal sound taking up 12 to 18 minutes at a pop. The overall effect is both calming and provocative."

Writing on its 25th anniversary, music journalist Daryl Worthington wrote that "It’s the sonic antithesis of a life hack, fragments of melody or lush timbral collisions tangling through each other in moves that never seem linear. The music isn’t formless, but it floats atop a spectacularly unsettled ictus.".

Track listing

CD release

Double vinyl release

References

1997 albums
Stars of the Lid albums
Kranky albums
Instrumental albums
Post-rock albums by American artists
Albums produced by Adam Wiltzie